Christmas Song Book is an album by Italian singer Mina, released in 2013.

In the album, Mina covers twelve Christmas songs, written between 1818 ("Stille Nacht, heilige Nacht", original version of "Silent Night") and 1973 ("Old Fashion Christmas"). Among the others, she sings four Bing Crosby hits ("The Secret of Christmas", "I'll Be Home for Christmas”"How Lovely Is Christmas" and "White Christmas").

Two songs were previously released: "Have Yourself a Merry Little Christmas" (for the 2012 album, 12 (American Song Book)) and "Silent Night" (for the 2010 movie, La banda dei Babbi Natale by Italian comedians Aldo, Giovanni & Giacomo and published in the EP Piccola Strenna).

The song "Baby, It's Cold Outside", always performed in a duo, has been recorded with Italian comedian and TV presenter Fiorello.

The album peaked at number 6 on the Italian Albums Chart and it was certified gold by the Federation of the Italian Music Industry.

Track listing

Certifications

References

External links
Mina Mazzini official website

Mina (Italian singer) albums
2013 Christmas albums
Covers albums
Pop Christmas albums